John Brendan Law (February 13, 1905 – October 14, 1962) was an American professional football player who played in the National Football League in 1930 for the Newark Tornadoes, appearing in one game.

References

1905 births
1962 deaths
Newark Tornadoes players
Players of American football from New York (state)